Pablo Saavedra Reinado (born January 29, 1975, in Pontevedra) is an S9 swimmer from Spain.  He competed at the 1996 Summer Paralympics, winning a bronze medal in 4 x 100 meter 34 point freestyle relay race. He competed at the 1992 Summer Paralympics and 2000 Summer Paralympics, where he did not medal at either Games.

References 

Spanish male freestyle swimmers
Spanish male butterfly swimmers
Living people
1975 births
Paralympic bronze medalists for Spain
Sportspeople from Pontevedra
Swimmers at the 1992 Summer Paralympics
Swimmers at the 1996 Summer Paralympics
Swimmers at the 2000 Summer Paralympics
Paralympic medalists in swimming
Medalists at the 1996 Summer Paralympics
Medalists at the World Para Swimming Championships
Paralympic swimmers of Spain
S9-classified Paralympic swimmers